Sol Madrid is a 1968 film directed by Brian G. Hutton and filmed in Acapulco. It was released in the UK as The Heroin Gang. The MGM film starred David McCallum, Stella Stevens, Telly Savalas and Ricardo Montalbán with John Cassavetes being replaced by Rip Torn prior to filming. It was the final film of Paul Lukas.

Plot
Half a million dollars is stolen from the Mafia by small-time crook Harry Mitchell, who splits it with girlfriend Stacey Woodward and takes off for Acapulco.

The mob sends hit man Dano Villanova to deal with Harry and get the money back. Sol Madrid, an undercover narc, is out to find Harry first, hoping to persuade him to testify against organized crime in court.

Stacey happens to be Villanova's former girlfriend. Things get complicated in Mexico, where a heroin dealer named Dietrich is engaged in criminal activity while Mexican law official Jalisco is on the case. Before she can flee on a yacht, Stacey is taken captive by Villanova and shot up with dope until she's turned into an addict.

Harry is caught and killed.  Jalisco isn't what he seems to be, so Madrid not only must deal with him, but with Villanova and Dietrich as well.

Cast
David McCallum  ...  Sol Madrid  
Stella Stevens  ...  Stacey Woodward  
Telly Savalas  ...  Emil Dietrich  
Ricardo Montalbán  ...  Jalisco  (credited as Ricardo Montalban)
Rip Torn  ...  Dano Villanova  
Pat Hingle  ...  Harry Mitchell  
Paul Lukas  ...  Capo Riccione  
Michael Ansara  ...  Capt. Ortega  
Michael Conrad  ...  Scarpi

Soundtrack

The film score was composed by Lalo Schifrin and the soundtrack album was released on the MGM label in 1968. An expanded edition of the soundtrack was released on by Film Score Monthly in 2010 as part of the five CD box set The Cincinnati Kid: Lalo Schifrin Film Scores Vol. 1 (1964-1968).

Track listing
All compositions by Lalo Schifrin
 "Sol Madrid (Main Theme)" - 2:00   
 "Fiesta" - 1:35   
 "Stacey's Bolero" - 2:36   
 "The Burning Candle" - 2:25   
 "Adagietto" - 2:50   
 "Sol Madrid (Main Theme)" - 1:55   
 "The Golden Trip" - 2:35   
 "Charanga" - 2:20   
 "El Patio" - 2:25   
 "Villanova's Villa" - 2:10   
 "Bolero #2" - 2:07   
 "Villanova's Chase" - 2:07

Personnel
Lalo Schifrin - composer, conductor
Laurindo Almeida - guitar
Unnamed Orchestra conducted by Robert Armbruster
George del Barrio - orchestration

References

External links

1968 films
Films directed by Brian G. Hutton
Films scored by Lalo Schifrin
Films about the illegal drug trade
Films set in Acapulco
Films shot in Mexico
Films produced by Elliott Kastner
1960s English-language films
American crime films
1960s American films